De Vier Mullers  is a 1935 Dutch film directed by Rudolf Meinert. A separate version Everything for the Company was produced, also directed by Meinert.

Cast
Adolf Bouwmeester
Wiske Ghijs
Johannes Heesters
Johan Kaart
Tilly Perin-Bouwmeester
Jacques Van Bylevelt (as Jacques van Bijlevelt)
Gusta Chrispijn-Mulder
Minny Erfmann
Cissy Van Bennekom
Johan Schmitz

External links 
 

1935 films
Dutch black-and-white films
Films directed by Rudolf Meinert
Dutch multilingual films
1935 multilingual films
1930s Dutch-language films